Pierre-Laurent Baeschlin (1886 – 1958) was a French artist known for his landscapes and still lifes involving flowers.
A pupil of Pierre Montezin and Henri-Camille Danger, Baeschlin exhibited at the Salon des Artistes Français from 1912.

His works are mainly in British and French collections.

His daughter Germaine Madeleine Baschlin-Chapuis also became a painter specialized in flowers who exhibited at the Salon d'Automne and the Société des Artistes Indépendants from 1920.Grove Dictionary of Artists

Sources 

 "Benezit Dictionary of Artists" 2006

External links 

 Victoria Fine Art, St. Albans, Hertfordshire:  Baeschlin
 Ask Art:  Pierre-Laurent Baeschlin
 Christie's Sale in 2004:  "Bouquet de fleurs"
 Sotheby's Sale in 2004:  "Jardin"
 Art History Research:  Madeleine Chapuis

References 

20th-century French painters
French male painters
1886 births
1958 deaths